José Irene Junco Casanova (born June 3, 1890 - death date unknown) was a Cuban baseball pitcher in the Cuban League and the Negro leagues. He played from 1909 to 1922 with several clubs, including Club Fé, Habana, Cuban Stars (West), and the Cuban Stars (East).

External links

1890 births
Year of death missing
Cuban League players
Cuban baseball players
Club Fé players
Habana players
Cuban Stars (East) players
Cuban Stars (West) players
San Francisco Park players